Escape from L.A.: Original Score Album From the Motion Picture  is the score by John Carpenter and Shirley Walker to the film of the same name. It was released in August, 1996 through Milan Records. A limited expanded edition was released in February, 2014 through La-La Land Records.

Track listing

Personnel

 John Carpenter – composition
 Shirley Walker – synthesizer, composition, arrangement, production
 Jamie Muhoberac – samples
 Nyle Steiner – electronic valve instrument
 Mike Watts – synthesizer
 Mike Fisher – electronic percussion
 Tommy Morgan – harmonicas
 Daniel Greco – hammer dulcimer 
 John Goux – guitars
 Nathan East – bass
 John Robinson – rock drums
 Tom Raney – timpani soloist
 Greg Goodall – timpani soloist
 Robert Zimmitti – daiko drum soloist
 Endre Granat – violin soloist, concert master
 Jon Clarke – soprano oboe solo
 Lolita Ritmanis – orchestration
 Michael McCuistion – orchestration 
 Robert Fernandez – recording, mixing
 Doug Botnick – recording

References

John Carpenter soundtracks
1996 soundtrack albums
Film scores
Milan Records soundtracks
La-La Land Records soundtracks
Action film soundtracks